Ruby (July 13, 1973 – November 6, 1998) was a 4.5 ton Asian elephant who lived at the Phoenix Zoo and was famous for creating paintings.  The most expensive of her paintings sold for $25,000.

Early life

Ruby was born in Thailand, and was shipped to the Phoenix Zoo in February 1974 when she was about seven months old.  Initially, she lived with a goat and some chickens for a few years without any elephant companionship.   Her painting career began when her keepers saw her scratching in the dirt of her enclosure with a stick, and offered her a brush and paints.

In time, she was moved into the main enclosure with the zoo's two other elephants, both African.  African and Asian Elephants are of different species, and Ruby did not get along with the other two.  Zoo officials decided to breed her, to provide her with companionship.

Pregnancy

In 1996, when she was 22, Ruby was shipped to the Tulsa Zoo to mate with a male elephant named Allan (who still lives in Tulsa) and lived in Tulsa for about a year. When she became pregnant in 1997, she was returned to Phoenix. She named the baby elephant 
Wilbur soot. Another female Asian elephant, Indu, was loaned from the Houston Zoo to be Ruby's birthing companion. Indu still lives at the Phoenix Zoo.

Death

At the end of October 1998, Ruby began to show signs of labor, but the birth didn't start. On Halloween, the zoo's veterinarians determined that her calf had died in her womb, and the decision was made to perform a Caesarean operation.  When surgery began on November 6, it was discovered that her uterus had ripped and a massive infection had spread through her abdominal cavity.  Her male fetal calf weighed 300 pounds, twice the size of a normal newborn elephant.

Ruby was euthanized immediately and her death triggered an outpouring of grief throughout the Phoenix area. When the Phoenix Zoo announced a free-admission day in honor of Ruby's memory, 43,000 people attended, nearly triple a normal day's attendance.

Ruby's House 
In the late 1990s, the Caretaker's House, a small stone cottage on the zoo grounds (left over from when the zoo site was a fish hatchery operated from the 1930s to the 1950s) was extensively renovated and dedicated to Ruby's memory and honor. Ruby's House has become a popular venue at the Phoenix Zoo for weddings and receptions.

See also
 List of historical elephants
 Art and music section of Elephant cognition

References

Further reading
 

Individual elephants
1973 animal births
1998 animal deaths
Visual arts by animals